Terril Community School District was a school district headquartered in Terril, Iowa.

On July 1, 2010, it merged with the Graettinger Community School District to form the Graettinger–Terril Community School District.

References

External links
 

Defunct school districts in Iowa
2010 disestablishments in Iowa
School districts disestablished in 2010
Education in Dickinson County, Iowa